Blokus Portable: Steambot Championship, known in Japan as , is a 2005 puzzle video game developed and published by Irem Software Engineering for the PlayStation 2 and later ported to the PlayStation Portable in Japan. The PlayStation Portable version was later published outside Japan by Majesco Entertainment. It is based on the board game Blokus and features characters from Steambot Chronicles (known in Japan as Bumpy Trot). Like in Steambot Chronicles, players are able to customize the appearance of their characters.

Gameplay
Each player receives a pile of blocks that resemble polyominoes. Players must place blocks on the board starting at the corners and then extend it from the corners of the pieces they have placed. The game is over when no one can place any more pieces. The player with the fewest pieces remaining wins.

Reception

In Japan, Famitsu gave the PlayStation 2 version a score of two sixes and two fives, for a total of 22 out of 40.  Elsewhere, the PSP version received "mixed" reviews according to video game review aggregator Metacritic.

References

External links
 
 Blokus Portable: Steambot Championship at Majesco Entertainment America
 Blokus Portable: Steambot Championship at Majesco Entertainment Europe

2005 video games
Irem games
Majesco Entertainment games
Multiplayer and single-player video games
PlayStation 2 games
PlayStation Portable games
Puzzle video games
Tomcat System games
Video game spin-offs
Video games based on board games
Video games developed in Japan
Video games featuring protagonists of selectable gender